Variações may refer to:

 António Variações (1944–1984), Portuguese singer and songwriter
 Variações (film), 2019 film about António Variações